DiBEG (The Digital Broadcasting Experts Group) was founded in September 1997 to promote ISDB-T International, the Digital Broadcasting System, in the world.

See also
ISDB
ISDB-T International

External links

ISDB
Working groups